The Liga 2, most commonly spelled as Liga II, is the second level of the Romanian football league system. The league changed its name from Divizia B just before the start of the 2006–07 football season. It is currently sponsored by Casa Pariurilor, a betting company under the official name Liga 2 Casa Pariurilor.

Format

Divisions
Since its inception in 1934, Liga II has had between 2 and 9 parallel divisions, with clubs divided based on geographic regions.

Generally, Seria I includes eastern teams while Seria II includes western sides, although clubs near the center of the country are allowed to choose in which series they will compete.

The first six teams from each series participate in a play-off for potential promotion to Liga I. The teams placed from 7th to 12th will play a relegation play-off, where the last two teams are relegated to Liga III. The first team in each series will be promoted to Liga I at the end of the season, and the teams in 12th place will play another match to decide the 5th team that will be relegated to Liga III.

Until the 2012–13 season, Liga II had 2 groups of 16 teams each. At the end of 2012–13 and 2013–14 seasons, the last five teams were relegated.

Single division
Beginning with the 2016–17 season, Liga II has a single division of 20 teams.

List of champions and promoted teams
Teams promoted are shown in bold or in "Other teams promoted" column.

Champions and promotions
193 titles were awarded for winning the Liga II championship.85 teams won the Liga II championship.

See also

Liga I
Liga III
Liga IV

External links

References

 
2
Rom
Professional sports leagues in Romania